Arthur Olsen (March 19, 1907 – October 17, 1943) was a Norwegian boxer who competed in the 1928 Summer Olympics.

In 1928 he was eliminated in the second round of the featherweight class after losing his fight to the upcoming silver medalist Víctor Peralta.

External links
Part 3 the boxing tournament

1907 births
1943 deaths
Featherweight boxers
Olympic boxers of Norway
Boxers at the 1928 Summer Olympics
Norwegian male boxers